The 1980 Ole Miss Rebels football team represented the University of Mississippi during the 1980 NCAA Division I-A football season.

Schedule

Personnel

Season summary

vs Mississippi State

References

Ole Miss
Ole Miss Rebels football seasons
Ole Miss Rebels football